Awa Sène Sarr is a Senegalese actress and comedian.

Biography
Desiring to become a lawyer, Sarr studied law at the University of Dakar. She later enrolled in the National Institute of the Arts of Dakar in Senegal and graduated in 1980.

She has been a resident at the Daniel-Sorano National Theater in Dakar since 1980. Sarr has participated in several film festivals, including Cannes in 2005. In 2000, she played Mada in Ousmane Sembène's Faat Kiné.

Sarr has performed in over forty plays, including texts by Marie N'Diaye, Ahmadou Kourouma, Catherine Anne and Philippe Blasband. She organizes the Horlonge du Sud literary café every month in Brussels, intended to highlight African literature.

She hosted a radio program on Wolof language poetry entitled Taalifi Doomi Réewmi on the Radiodiffusion Télévision Sénégalaise (RTS).

Sarr has voiced Karaba the witch in Michel Ocelot's film trilogy Kirikou and the Sorceress (1998), Kirikou and the Wild Beasts (2005), and Kirikou and the Men and Women (2012). In the final film, she advised Ocelot to include a scene under a baobab tree in the village with a griot.

Partial filmography
1989 : Dakar Clando
1989 : Le grotto de Sou Jacob
1997 : Une couleur café d'Henri Duparc
1998 : Kirikou and the Sorceress
2000 : Faat Kiné
2000 : Amul Yakaar
2000 : Battù
2005 : Kirikou and the Wild Beasts
2012 : Kirikou and the Men and Women
2001 :   Karmen Geï de Joe Gaye Ramaka

References

External links
Awa Sene Sarr at the Internet Movie Database

Living people
Senegalese actresses
People from Dakar
Year of birth missing (living people)